The K–12 Tour was the third tour by American artist Melanie Martinez, in support of her album K–12. Comprising 84 shows, the tour began on October 13, 2019, in Washington, D.C. and concluded prematurely on February 17, 2020, in Brixton, England. It was originally set to conclude on July 26, 2020 in Denver, Colorado, but the show and the remaining upcoming tour dates were cancelled in light of the COVID-19 pandemic.

Background
The tour was officially announced on July 29, 2019. On the same day, the dates for the shows in Northern America were also announced. The dates for the shows in Europe were announced 2 months later, on September 20, 2019. More dates for Northern American shows were announced on February 11, 2020.

Set list 

"Wheels on the Bus"
"Class Fight"
"The Principal"
"Show & Tell"
"Nurse's Office"
"Drama Club"
"Strawberry Shortcake"
"Lunchbox Friends"
"Orange Juice"
"Detention"
"Teacher's Pet"
"High School Sweethearts"
"Recess"
Encore
"Sippy Cup"
"Alphabet Boy"
"Mad Hatter"
"Fire Drill"

Notes
On select shows in Europe, "Sippy Cup" was cut from the setlist.
"Copy Cat" was performed during shows in Frankfurt, Paris, Tilburg and London.

Shows

Cancelled dates

Notes

References

 
 

2019 concert tours
2020 concert tours
Concert tours postponed due to the COVID-19 pandemic
Concert tours of North America
Concert tours of Europe
Concert tours of the United States
Concert tours of Canada
Concert tours of Ireland
Concert tours of the United Kingdom
Concert tours of the Netherlands
Concert tours of Germany
Concert tours of Portugal
Concert tours of Spain
Concert tours of Italy
Concert tours of Switzerland
Concert tours of Austria
Concert tours of Denmark
Concert tours of Norway
Concert tours of Sweden
Concert tours of Belgium
Concert tours of France